Zweibel is a surname. Notable people with the surname include:

 Alan Zweibel (born 1950), American television writer, author, and playwright
 Ellen Gould Zweibel (born 1952), American astrophysicist
 Jane Zweibel, American artist and art therapist

See also
 Zweibel Farmstead, a historic estate in Papillion, Nebraska
 Zwiebel

Yiddish-language surnames